Bulbophyllum pachyneuron, also known as the thick-veined bulbophyllum, is a species of orchid in the genus Bulbophyllum.

References

The Bulbophyllum-Checklist
The Internet Orchid Species Photo Encyclopedia

pachyneuron